AS New Soger is a football club in Lubumbashi, Democratic Republic of Congo.  They play in the Linafoot Ligue 2, the second level of professional football in DR Congo. 

Football clubs in the Democratic Republic of the Congo
Football clubs in Lubumbashi